Thames Polytechnic Football Club was a football club based in Eltham, England.

History
Founded shortly after the creation of Woolwich Polytechnic, Woolwich Polytechnic joined the London League Division One in 1924. In 1945, the club entered the FA Cup for the first time, playing Lloyds, losing in the first qualifying round following a replay. In 1956, Woolwich Polytechnic left the London League to play in the Kent County League, returning in 1963. The following year, the club were founding members of the Greater London League.

In 1971, the club were placed in the Metropolitan–London League and renamed Thames Polytechnic, following the merger between the institution and the Hammersmith College of Art and Building. In 1975, Thames Polytechnic became founding members of the London Spartan League, following the Metropolitan–London League's merger with the Spartan League. In 1985, the club joined the Kent League, joining the Kent County League in 1992. In 2003, Thames Polytechnic left the Kent County League.

Ground
Thames Polytechnic played at Kidbrooke Lane, Well Hall, in Eltham until 1993, with the facilities owned by the institution. In the modern day, the grounds are still used by the University of Greenwich and Blackheath Rugby. For the remaining ten years of the club's existence, Thames Polytechnic played at Avery Hill Park, also owned by the university.

Records
Best FA Cup performance: Second qualifying round, 1946–47
Best FA Vase performance: First round, 1986–87

References

External links

Defunct football clubs in England
University of Greenwich
London League (football)
Kent County League
Greater London League
Metropolitan–London League
Spartan League
Southern Counties East Football League
Sport in the Royal Borough of Greenwich
Association football clubs disestablished in 2003
Defunct football clubs in London
2003 disestablishments in England
University and college football clubs in England